On 21 May 2021, a Beechcraft King Air 350i belonging to the Nigerian Air Force crashed near the Kaduna International Airport, killing all 11 occupants, including the Chief of Army Staff of the Nigerian Army Ibrahim Attahiru.

Aircraft
The Nigerian Air Force had six Beechcraft B300 King Air 350i. The NAF201 also crashed on 21 February, 2021.

Accident
On the evening of 21 May 2021, a Nigerian Air Force Beechcraft King Air 350i with Ibrahim Attahiru and ten other occupants were on a visit to the northern state of Kaduna to attend a Nigerian Army recruit passing out parade the following day. During the flight the aircraft crashed killing all on board including Attahiru.

See also
List of accidents and incidents involving military aircraft (2020–present)

References

External links

Nigerian Air Force Beechcraft King Air 350i crash
Nigerian Air Force Beechcraft King Air 350i crash
Accidents and incidents involving military aircraft
Nigerian Air Force Beechcraft King Air 350i crash
Accidents and incidents involving the Beechcraft Super King Air
Aviation accidents and incidents in Nigeria
Military history of Nigeria
Nigerian Air Force Beechcraft King Air 350i crash